Charles George Wright (born 11 December 1938) is a former professional footballer and manager. Born in Scotland. He gained the name "wonder boy" after a great trial game for Morton against Queens Park (B Division 1955/56). He continued with his juvenile team Glentyan Thistle, playing in the Lord Weir Cup Final at Cathkin Park in June 1956. He was signed by junior team Glencairn Thistle to serve an apprenticeship before moving to Rangers.

Wright was caretaker manager and then manager of Bolton Wanderers in the 1984–85 season. His first game as full-time manager was a 2–0 win against Plymouth Argyle. However, he was quickly replaced by ex-Liverpool and England defender Phil Neal.

Managerial statistics

References

External links
Bolton Wanderers – profile

1938 births
Living people
Footballers from Glasgow
Hong Kong footballers
Scottish footballers
Scottish emigrants to Hong Kong
Hong Kong people of Scottish descent
Association football goalkeepers
Rangers F.C. players
Grimsby Town F.C. players
Charlton Athletic F.C. players
Bolton Wanderers F.C. players
English Football League players
Scottish football managers
Hong Kong football managers
York City F.C. managers
Bolton Wanderers F.C. managers
English Football League managers